The Victorian Railways used a variety of flat wagons for the transport of a wide range of loads. Generally speaking, the bogie wagons were custom-built for the job, while the fixed-wheel variants were cut down from former open wagons. Loadings would be placed on the deck and, if necessary, protected with tarps, then secured to the wagons with chains or rope connecting to lashing rings along the side of the wagon frames.

This page covers flat wagons used for general traffic, but also those reserved for ISO containers and other containerised goods, along with flat wagons fitted with bulkheads or other fittings for specialised traffic such as steel pipes or timber. It does not cover flat wagons that were cut down from open wagons, although links to the relevant articles are provided as appropriate.

Generally speaking, flat wagons in the VR fleet included the letter K, Q or S in their code; which of those largely depended on the era that the wagon entered service. K was the original code, with Q introduced for bogie flat wagons and S between the two world wars. It was also fairly common for various classes of open wagons to have their sides and ends removed, temporarily or permanently, to increase the range of flat wagons available.

Unlike other wagon pages and because the vast majority of the fleet was fitted with bogies, these vehicles are not divided into fixed and bogie variants initially, but instead into various traffic types. Some of the wagons listed here may appear at first glance to be more of an "open wagon" type, but they were listed as flat wagons by the Victorian Railways.

General traffic wagons

Original design—K, NK & IK
The first general traffic flat wagons to be used on the Victorian railways system were four-wheeled deck units classed "K", with around fifty purchased from Wright & Sons delivered in 1859. A further fifteen were purchased from local Melbourne firms Grant and Williams up to 1862, and then a larger batch of 21 wagons from Chambers in 1864. Notably, the listed wagons in each of these three orders are not consecutive, indicating either incomplete records or that wagons could have been delivered unnumbered with the details applied as they were utilised for traffic.

Another batch of fifty were constructed by the firm Thomas in 1872, numbered K213 to K262, and followed by K264 to K312 by Rawlings in 1874. From 1882 to 1885 Johnson & Co. delivered wagons K313 to K362, and in 1883 Harkness & Co. of Sandhurst provided K363 to K412. During this period the Victorian Railways constructed their own wagons in parallel; including a number of replacements for older, withdrawn vehicles, the total constructed at Williamstown Workshops came to over 130 units between 1873 and 1885, plus three each in 1886 and 1887. 20 further wagons were purchased from the Australian Rolling Stock Company in 1898; K32 from Spotswood and the other 19 units from North Williamstown, with these taking numbers of wagons scrapped the same year.

Given the way that older vehicle identities were recycled, it is thought that well over a thousand vehicles in over fourteen variants were classed "K" at different points in time.

By the early 1890s well over 80 open wagons had their sides and ends removed, being reclassed as IK and fitted with removable water tanks for a wide range of uses stretching from water to weed spray to tar. Each vehicle had a capacity of 1,200 gallons, except IK wagons 1136, 2119 and 2777 each with a capacity of 1,150 gallons, and IK 1124 and 2273 with a capacity of 1,600 gallons. Eight of the fleet were modified and reclassified as regular K wagons between 1929 and 1951; the rest of the fleet were gradually scrapped between 1914 and 1954.

From 1 December 1923, the Victorian Railways took control of the Deniliquin & Moama Railway Company and all its assets, including four flat wagons. Under VR ownership these were coded NK1–4, although generally ex-D&MRC stock was given a D prefix. Vincent has hypothesised that these flat wagons had been used for ballast train works by the D&MRC, justifying the "N" code prefix.  All four were scrapped within eighteen months of purchase.

From the late 1920s the Victorian Railways fleet was being progressively upgraded to westinghouse air brakes, but many of the original K fleet were not able to support the new equipment. These were scrapped and replaced with around a hundred cut-down wagons, almost always ex open wagons of the I type but occasionally with other types mixed in; these took on the former K numbers. At the same time, as noted below, the former carriage-carrying G type wagons were modified and recoded to K, taking numbers 413 and above; some of these had originally been sourced from the Hobsons Bay railway. Many of the surviving original K fleet had since been modified to other uses, with many allocated to crane or construction trains in various roles, and others being fitted with water tanks.

In 1953 a further batch of 70 open wagons were converted to K wagons, taking the number range 1–70 to give autocoupled vehicles in the class. Vehicles 1–34 and 70 were converted at Ballarat North Workshops, and the remainder at Bendigo North Workshops. These wagons weighed a little under 7 tons and had a 16-ton capacity. Existing K wagons in this range were renumbered into open gaps, including the original K1 to K71, and K12 to K72. By this point, some numbers had been used four times. One of the last conversions was the recovery of the underframe from refrigerated van T304, which became the fourth K2 in 1978.

By the 1960s the K design had largely been superseded by bogie wagons with higher maximum speeds and capacity relative to tare weight. Between that and the longstanding use of the fleet in auxiliary roles, the code connotation had devolved from a traffic wagon to a departmental code. Reflecting this, the open wagons which had been converted to KCC for snowy mountains cement traffic were cut down and converted to safety wagons, used as spacers between other vehicles for over-length loads, such as pipes to Gippsland, or between combustible loads like explosives and sources of heat, particularly but not exclusively steam locomotives. The KCC number range had been 1–170, and 62 of these were converted and reclassed as the second IK type. When 160 IK was withdrawn in 1974, it was replaced with the underframe taken from recently scrapped louvre van U1115.

Early bogie wagons (Q)
By the 1870s rail wagon technology had evolved to permit longer wagons fitted with bogies. This allowed higher operating speeds due to better load balancing, and trains were easier to manage with less operating equipment like brakes and couplers over the length, than would be required for shorter fixed-axle wagons. The first Q wagon was constructed in 1871 with a flat timber frame, reinforced with iron gussets. It was followed by classmates Q2–Q12 in 1872, Q13 in 1875 and Q14 in 1877 and Q1538 in 1878, all to the same design. Some of the earlier batch were constructed by the railways, but for the most part the work was contracted out to Thomas or Tozier. Handbrakes were initially applied to bogies individually, and staff were reminded to apply hand brakes at both ends of a wagon when necessary. These early wagons generally operated for 20–30 years, most being withdrawn from normal service before the Great War. The majority were scrapped at the time, but like their K predecessors a portion of the class were recycled in other traffics. For instance, Q13 was fitted with a steam shovel jib, while Q14, 20, 21 and 31 were fitted with overhead wire stringing equipment for the Melbourne electrification scheme, and Q11–12, 17–18, 24, 26–27 and 30 were fitted with tanks for pintsch gas, which was used for passenger train lighting. Q19 was notable as part of the Better Farming Train consist.

A new batch of Q wagons was built starting from 1913, with Q39 to Q63 entering service that year followed by Q64–Q88 in 1915, a new Q1 in 1922, then Q89–Q128 in 1925. Q1 was shorter than the rest of the fleet and constructed with a timber deck in lieu of steel. All vehicles of this type used rivetted plate-frame components and a "fishbelly" underframe design with a strengthened centre to resist twisting. Over time these vehicles were upgraded to automatic couplers and more modern bogie designs, and in 1963–64 nine wagons were converted to higher speed bogies and reclassed QF1–9, possibly to mark them for standard gauge trains. A number of Q wagons were fitted with supports for the transport of FQX-series underframes, which would later replace them in traffic.

With the exception of the shorter Q1, each fishbelly Q was rated for 30 tons (31 tons after buffers were removed), and instructions were issued for the loading of various standard goods types; for instance a single wagon could transport 360 wheat bags, stacked and secured in a precise method, when grain wagons were in short supply. By the late 1970s Q73 had been allocated specifically to trains originating from Jewell, as a spacer vehicle when transporting cast concrete bridge beams in conjunction with higher-capacity wagons. Other wagons operated in sets, transporting loads of extended, welded rail lengths around the state. These rails were loaded across five wagons at a time, and flexed with the train when running through junctions and around curves. Q77, 87 and 106 were used to create the adjustable bulkhead QAB series outlined below.

From 1979, 28 wagons were recoded from Q to VFAA, plus some recoded on paper but not physically before scrapping. VFAA100 was particularly short-lived, only running in service with the new code for about three weeks before being scrapped. QF 1–2 and 6–9 became VFBY, later VFBF 1, 2, 7 and 9.

Q129 was specially constructed in 1926 as a skeleton type wagon, with raised beams 2'6" apart specifically for the transport of the engine units from the imported narrow-gauge Garratt locomotives G41 and G42. It was used when either engine had to be transported from its home depot to Newport Workshops for maintenance, and occasionally for other narrow gauge engine transfers. To facilitate this, the vehicle was fitted with hinged buffers at both ends which could be lowered out of the way, allowing the deck "rails" to meet the raised ramps at each of the transfer sites. The vehicle was condemned in 1979 and sold to the Emerald Tourist Railway Board. It has since been cosmetically restored and is now a static display inside Menzies Creek Museum display shed. While the wagon was originally fitted with standard barframe bogies, it was later refitted with bogies recovered from the tender of locomotive V499.

Q130 was converted in 1953 from the underframe of horsebox FF9, and fitted with cement mixing gear. It lasted in service until 1966.

ModelEtch previously had a brass kit available of the 1913 Q type wagons.

43ft ACF wagons (S)
In 1925 the Victorian and South Australian Railways were experimenting with imported, standardised bogie goods wagons designed by the American Car & Foundry, USA, to replace large portions of their existing fleet. While South Australia adopted the designs wholesale, Victoria elected to only import two each of the louvre, open and flat wagon types and a small number of open-top hoppers. The flat wagons were coded S1 and S2, and were essentially identical to the South Australian Railways' Fb class. However, the Victorian Railways was apparently satisfied with the Q design, as no further S wagons were constructed or purchased.

During the second world war demand for flat wagons rose astronomically, and to cater for this about half of the open E wagons had sides and ends removed, being converted to flat wagons. They generally retained their original numbers, except E1 which became S203 to avoid a conflict with S1. Including the original two flat wagons, by the end of the conversion period there were 100 S flat wagons in service. It has been reported anecdotally that the sides and ends of the E wagons were used as covers for piles of debris at Newport Workshops.

After the war 71 of the S wagons were restored to their original E configuration and identities. A further 20 S wagons were fitted with tanks supplied by various petroleum companies, and the frames were recoded to Oil Tank with a numbers 205–206 and 217–234; those would later be recoded OT, TW or variants thereof. By 1950, the only remaining S wagons were 1, 2, 26, 50, 60, 77, 108, 115 and 158. In 1959 S158 was used to create QC5 (later reclassed QCF and QCX) for small containers, and in 1962 S26 and S60 were recoded to SF and SEF respectively for the transport of cable drums. Later in life, wagons S1 and S115 had brackets fitted for a single 20 ft ISO container, offset from one end to provide loading room. The final six wagons lasted in service until the late '70s, with S50, 77 and 108 withdrawn in 1978. In 1979 S1 was reclassed as HR91 for depot work, S2 was withdrawn, and S115 was reclassed as VFDA115 under the Railways of Australia coding. It ran in service for two years before being reclassed as HR74 in 1981, then VZWA16 in 1985.

Veteran Models has produced O scale versions of the S wagons as kits. Eureka Models had intended to produce models in HO scale, in conjunction with the E, OT/TW and South Australian series of wagons, but this project has since been shifted to Phoenix Models.

Cable drum traffic
From 1961, a custom fleet of vehicles were converted for the transport of coils of electrical cables, wrapped around timber drums. The cables were steel with an aluminium shell, produced for the State Electricity Commission, and 1 1/4" thick to handle 222,000 volts. Each drum weighed four tons. They had previously been transported in four-wheel wagons, but the vibration often led to the aluminium coating of the cables being damaged with resulting claims against the Victorian Railways. This was resolved on the bogie wagons with specially designed cradles, and the drums were protected against vibration by recycling withdrawn Westinghouse brake hoses.

Known traffic was from Melbourne to New South Wales (470 reels), Gippsland (300 reels) and the Snowy Mountains (660 reels).

SF, SEF, SC, SCX, VFFX
The first wagon converted was open wagon E78, in July 1961, followed by E125 in December of the same year. Both were fitted with cradles in lieu of sides and ends, and recoded SC.

Flat wagons S26 and S60 were converted in 1962–63 as temporary additions to the fleet, being coded SF or SEF, before being permanently recoded to SC in 1965.

In 1966 all four wagons were recoded to SCX 1 to 4, permitting use on the standard gauge system, and they were joined by SCX 5 to 7 (formerly E/S wagons 159, 185 and 132 respectively) with the final member, SCX8 ex E151, converted in 1968.

In 1974 wagons 1, 2 and 4 were recoded to SX 3, 1 and 2 respectively with cradles removed but gauge-exchange facilities retained for general traffic, and this was repeated with SCX 5 to SX 4 in 1976. Of those, 1 and 4 were recoded to VFEX (same numbers) in 1983 and 1979 respectively; SX 3 was recycled as HR 148, and SX 2 as HR 22 later VZWA 5 for transporting wheel sets around depots. The remaining pair of VFEX wagons were stored by 1981, and VFEX4 was used as a replacement underframe for a VTQY tank wagon in 1983.

The remaining SCX wagons, 3, 6, 7 and 8, were recoded to VFFX in 1979–1980. By the time of recoding, 3 and 6 were each fitted with five pairs of cradles to carry a total of ten, four-ton cable drums, each a little under 6' diameter; while 7 and 8 were fitted with sets of cradles either end and a gap in the middle of the wagon, permitting transport of four, 7'7" diameter cable drums over either bogie.

63ft flat wagons

SFX, SFF, VFLY & VFLF
In 1965 a new, general purpose flat wagon was built at Newport Workshops. Coded SFX1, it had a 63 ft-long frame with timber decking, end bulkheads to keep loads from shifting longitudinally, and a full-length lashing rail along the side for rope or chain securing. Overall, it weighed around 26 tons for a load capacity of 49 tons. ISO container anchor points were provided along with regular stanchions and other fittings, all of which could be stowed in pockets underslung along the deck of the wagon.

After a year of trials a further 24 SFX wagons were built to the same design, entering service in batches every few months between mid-1967 and mid-1968. Each unit cost around $13,200 to construct. While these were being constructed further orders had been placed, and less than a week after SFX25 had entered service it was followed by SFX26, to a modified design with all-metal construction. It came out of the workshops slightly heavier but far stronger, and construction continued through to SFX50 to that design, then SFX51 to 60 with a wheel-type handbrake in lieu of the ratchet type employed previously. After a gap of nearly a year construction continued with SXF61 in the middle of 1969, with new vehicles on a regular basis until SFX120 entered service in September 1970. It is not clear which was the first SFX to not have full-length lashing rails provided.

As noted below, proper dedicated ISO container flat wagons were under construction at the same time, and that development took precedence. The SFX wagons had reduced value by this point, and were used instead as blank slates for conversions to other traffic. Eight were recoded to QGF for gas transport on the standard gauge system, and nine others to SFF for dedicated runs between Ballarat and Melbourne, and between Bairnsdale and Westall.

In 1977, SFX100 was provided with experimental tarpaulin frames on runners, allowing them to be retracted along the length of the wagon for loading of paper rolls for the Australian Paper Mills. The wagon was only used for the length of the experiment, and then superseded by a production run to the same concept. It was recoded to VFLX100 with the rest of the fleet, but ended up in extended storage before being cut down almost to its original configuration for pineboard transport.

The 1979 recode for SFX was VFLX, same numbers. Within a decade of the recoding, only around 20 vehicles were still in service; the rest had been converted to VQLX container wagons by removing the bulkheads and "skeletising" the floor to reduce tare weight. A handful remained in their original form as at June 1989, generally for departmental traffic including transport of welded rail lengths.

Further detail on the class is available in the Australian Model Railway Magazine, Issue 125, April 1984, although the associated drawing is not accurate.

QGF, VQEX & VQEY—Gas transport
In 1978, eight SFX bulkhead flat wagons were modified at Newport Workshops for explicit use on the standard gauge carrying loaded gas tanks, fixed within an ISO 20 ft container framework. The wagons had ISO ports fitted and "double shelf" couplers, which took the normal Janney-derived automatic coupler, and fitted steel plates above and below to stop adjacent wagons decoupling in the event of a derailment. The wagons retained their SFX-type bulkheads.

It is believed that the fleet only operated in service on the standard gauge line from Melbourne towards Sydney.

The wagons used were ex SFX 37, 90, 111 and 113–118, becoming QGF 1–8 respectively.

From 1979, vehicles were reclassed to VQEY with the exception of QGF2, which became VQEX indicating that it could be gauge converted. 5, 6 and 7 VQEY were similarly upgraded in 1982. Around 1988, the vast majority of bulkhead flat wagons were converted to normal container wagons, and recoded VQLX. The new numbers were essentially random.

SFF, VFLY & VFLF
In 1978 a set of nine SFX wagons had their gauge-exchange equipment removed, and were allocated to broad gauge containerised traffic between Melbourne and Ballarat, and between Bairnsdale and Westall. The converted wagons SFF 1–9 had been 105, 106, 108, 80, 81, 114 and 119.

In 1979 these wagons were reclassed to VFLY, and in 1988 the final wagon was recoded to VFLF; shortly afterwards it was defrocked and converted to container wagon VQLX119.

VFNX Retractable Tarpaulin
In parallel with the timber VFTY/X wagons outlined near the end of this article, fifty wagons were constructed for $57,570 each, with the same 63 ft frame and bulkhead design for the transport of rolls of newsprint-quality paper. The traffic originated at Maryvale, in the LaTrobe Valley, and ran to a distribution point at the Montague shipping sheds on the Port Melbourne line. The wagons used a rolling canvas cover, based on the experimental SFX100, to provide shelter for the two layers of paper rolls, and the wagons replaced the use of normal open wagons covered with tarps. Each had a tare weight of 29 tons and a loading capacity of 47 tons.

It has been theorised that the design of the vehicles was "home-grown" and when in service the mechanical roller system proved to be unreliable, with hoops often twisting when rolling open or closed leading to delays in loading. Over time the tarpaulins were replaced with yellow polyester materials.

As with the timber wagons, the units were numbered with additional zeros i.e. VFNX003; this may have been to assist with computerised wagon tracking systems by reminding staff to type numerals in the correct slots, but it is more likely that the additional zeros were superfluous.

In the early 1990s at least 28 wagons had the canvas equipment removed, as they were reallocated for sleeper transport in preparation for the Melbourne and Adelaide gauge-conversion project. These vehicles were renumbered but kept their class.

In 1991, VFNX1 was modified at Bendigo Workshops with an alternative canvas runner system. The same fifteen frameworks were used but a taut, blue plastic tarp was fitted on the outside of the framework rather than between bolsters, and this allowed a better internal mechanism to overcome the binding issues that had previously plagued the class. On completion the vehicle was recoded VFPX, and a further 13 wagons were converted. Numbers were essentially random, though VFNX3 was by chance modified to VFPX3.

From 1995 four VFNX wagons—4, 18, 122 and 124—were rebuilt as VFHX timber wagons using components acquired from Tasmania.

Lima used an international model as a base for an approximation of the VFNX wagon type, and sold it painted in brown with a green moulded tarpaulin and white VR logo on the sides.

75ft flat wagons (SKX)
From late 1967 a batch of 75 long-body flat wagons entered service, at a cost of around $17,600 each. They were classed SKX and numbered 1 through 75 for general use, to reduce demand on the remaining Q wagons and to ensure that enough ISO container wagons would be available as required. The wagons could be fitted with stanchions as required. They were 75 ft over end sills, had a tare weight of 25 tons and a capacity of 50 tons.

In 1972 four of the SKX series were recoded as SKF (but keeping their numbers), being locked to standard gauge operation between Melbourne and Sydney and fitted with ports for an unusual 37 ft container design. 13, 14, 44 and 45 were joined by 46 and 47 in the middle of 1973, and 71 about a year later.

In the 1979 recoding SKX vehicles became VFKX, and the SKF units were recoded to VFKY.

In 1984 22 randomly-selected SKF, VFKY and VFKX wagons were provided with cranes and bolsters for rail transport consists, being reclassed as VFRX/Y. The few remaining VFKX wagons in 1990–1991 were recycled as VEKX, VKKX or VQKX depending on traffic requirements at the time. In 1994, VFKX40 was recoded to VKKF for use as a safety wagon.

The class was noted as suffering cracked centre sills, solved by welding a cover plate fitted over the damaged section.

Oversize and heavy load wagons
This section covers vehicles designed for large and/or heavy loads which would normally be too tall or too heavy for transport with regular rolling stock. Some were designed with a lower central deck between the bogies allowing transport of tall loads, like locomotive boilers and power station equipment, while others were complete custom designs for whatever job was required.

QB / VWAA 1–11
The first well wagon was constructed in 1902 at Newport Workshops, and coded QB1. A further ten entered service between 1912 and 1913.

The class was constructed with a 52 ft long x 9 ft wide frame, at normal height over the bogies but lowering to roughly 9 inches clear of the railhead for the central 29ft9in deck. This deck portion contained a 3'9" x 18'0" opening, and was flanked either side by beams to support loads which could be placed in any of five positions each, as required. The central well appears to have been extendable, or perhaps plates at top and bottom were removed for particular loads which had to be suspended across more than one wagon. It is also possible that on construction the vehicles were fitted with stanchions for timber or pipe loads, although these do not appear in later photographs. Ten lashing rings per side and two per end were fitted to secure the loading.

The central portion could carry 14 tons; if a load were evenly distributed across the length of the wagon, the capacity was raised to 30 tons. The wagon itself weighed a little over 17 tons. A common use for the fleet was transport of locomotive boilers, but they could be used for a wide range of goods as required.

Bogies were the 1880s standard "diamondframe" type with spoked wheels; these were later superseded by plate frame and cast bogies, and some wagons received disc wheels. Splashers were fitted over cutouts in the angled slopes, and it appears these may have changed size over time.

QB7 was altered for "specific loading" in 1940, although no details are available. Other vehicles were apparently modified as required for any particular traffic, with fittings welded in place and then sometimes, but not always, removed with a cutting torch after the event; as a result many wagons were unique in at least one way.

Automatic couplers and IZ-style buffers were fitted to the whole fleet in 1931; these were replaced with shunters steps around 1957. XB roller-bearing bogies and a new handbrake arrangement were provided during a refurbishment program in the early to mid 1970s (although this did not result in a change in code). Also around the mid-1970s standard ISO container locks were fitted to the central well of at least some of the fleet, allowing the transport a single 20' ISO container when not required in other traffic and in response to a shortage of container-carrying capacity. The 1979 recoding the QB class became VWAA.

The class was generally withdrawn in the mid 1980s; some were recorded as scrapped shortly after, but most were spotted in various yards around the state in storage in 1991, and VWAA4 was seen in Bendigo Workshops as late as 1994. As of 2001, QB4 (as VWAA4-T) and QB6 are both owned by the Victorian Goldfields Railway, Maldon, with both in service. Vehicles 2, 5, 8 and 10 were owned by VicTrack, with 5 and 10 supposedly allocated to the then South Gippsland Railway although this was denied by the organisation at the time; QB2 was with Steamrail Victoria at Newport workshops, and QB8 was stored in the Paint Shop of Newport Workshops with a C class locomotive boiler load, pending space in an expanded museum.

In 2004, two of the fleet were being used by a contractor removing overhead wire on the Gippsland line between Warragul and Pakenham.

A brass kit of the class is available from Steam Era Models in HO scale.

QB/F / VWAA 12
A twelfth unit was constructed in 1921 to a varied design. No diagram is immediately available, but the wagon appears shorter overall and the central well has vertical rather than sloped walls. It is not clear what sort of framing was used for the central well, or if the entire centre of the wagon was an open frame. Photos indicate timber planks covering the entire section. In January 1962, QB12 was upgraded to "XB" cast bogies fitted with roller bearings, permitting its use on higher speed trains. It had reverted to its previous condition by September of that year. in 1979 the vehicle was recoded to VWAA12, later with the check letter "J" applied. It is not believed that it ever had ISO fixtures installed.

It was marked off register and scrapped in 1986, but spotted at the Spotswood Way and Works depot in 1992. In 2001 it was noted as owned by VicTrack, allocated to the ARHS, but located in the 707 Operations compound in Newport Workshops; at the time it had plain-bearing bogies.

QB 13 / QWF 1 / VWCY 1 / VWCF 1
For State Electricity Commission of Victoria traffic to Yallourn, even the QB series proved inadequate. A temporary vehicle had been assembled in 1922 using assorted steel stock and suburban motor carriage bogies to handle the weight. It never had a code or number allocated and was dismantled in 1924, with the parts returned to general stock. A proper heavy-duty vehicle entered service in October 1925, with a completely new design using custom three-axle bogies and a rivetted bar-frame, explicitly for the unique and heavy traffic. The wagon was 8'6" wide with a central well 4'0" wide and 16'0" long, with beams either side 2'4.25" thick and a mere 7.125" clear of the railhead. It is believed that the bogies used on this vehicle are unique, although similar in appearance to those provided under the OO wagons.

Coded QB13, it was 51 ft over body, 54 ft over pulling lines, and had a capacity of 60 tons. Like the QH wagons above, the axles in the bogies were spaced at 4'6" centres, but to a completely different design.

Automatic couplers were added in 1954, one of the last non-passenger vehicles to be so converted. In December 1961 it was reclassified as QW1, and about a month later reclassified to QWF1. In 1979 it was erroneously recoded VWCY, corrected nearly a decade later to VWCF with thousands of other Victorian Railways vehicles. By 1992 it had been stored pending preservation, and by 2001 it was allocated by VicTrack to the DERM Preservation Group in Newport Workshops, although its exact location was unknown.

QS 1 / VFHA 1
In 1941 a new, unique and unnumbered wagon was designed and built at Newport Workshops, for the transport of heavy electrical equipment, including stators, to Yallourn. The vehicle was an open framework, each end suspended on bolsters that themselves sat on a pair of four-wheel bogies each, to distribute the load. It was rarely used outside of the Yallourn traffic, and spent most of its time without bogies and with weeds growing through the body.

In 1962 it was coded QS1 to distinguish it from QS2, and later it became VFHA1-C before being placed into storage by 1981; it is known that it had not been used since 1975, and possibly not since 1962. In 2001 it was recorded as owned by VicTrack and allocated to the ARHS Museum, but also as having been scrapped.

Q 132–135 / QH 1–4 / VFGA 1–4
None of the railways' existing rolling stock was suited for exceedingly heavy loads. To rectify this, four wagons were created using frames recovered from S Class steam locomotive tenders. Initially coded Q132–135, the new vehicles entered service between 1955 and 1957 before being recoded to QH1–4 in 1962.

The first vehicle had something of a skeletal deck, only being fully covered above the bogies, while the remaining three had a completely sealed deck, reinforced side girders and nine pairs of lashing rings fitted to the deck in lieu of six pairs fixed to the side sills. Capacity was 90 tons distributed or 50 tons concentrated in the centre. It is not known which underframe came from each of the four locomotives.

One of the early uses was for transport of equipment to the Hazelwood Power Station in Gippsland, and to the north-east of the state for the Snowy Mountains scheme. After these traffic jobs were resolved the wagons were allocated to runs from Jewell railway station, in Melbourne's inner north, for transporting of large concrete bridge beams. When used with overlong traffic they would generally have "safety" wagons either side, typically empty K type flat wagons.

The Victorian Railways only had five sets of high-capacity, three-axle bogies available. One set was kept for display beneath H 220's tender at the Newport Railway Museum, leaving four sets to rotate between the QH wagons with occasional use QS or QW well wagons as required. When that happened, the QH wagons would be put into storage until the bogies could be returned. At least initially, Q132 and Q133's bogies were fitted with plain bearings, Q134 with Timken, and Q135 with SKF.

By 1975 the deck of QH1 had been plated over, though the sides were not reinforced.

In the 1979 recoding the class was relettered to VFGA, same numbers. From 1991 they were stored at Tottenham.

All four vehicles are owned by Victrack and listed as part of the Historic Vehicles Register. Circa 2001, VFGA 1 and 3 were being used by EDI at Newport Workshops for local movements; a few years later QH2 was used in Newport Workshops' East Block to store the tender of steam locomotive K 183 which had been damaged at Benalla; it was then noted as being fitted with roller-bearing bogies.

QH1 was reallocated from the Australian Railway Historical Society to the Seymour Railway Heritage Centre in September 2006, and has been reunited with an original welded tender tank. It may have had its bogies swapped with QH4 at some point. The remaining three are stored in various locations around Newport Workshops. Two of the four tender frames have been earmarked for preservation by the Newport Railway Museum, and still used as workshop vehicles at the Newport Workshops numbered VFGA 3 & 4 as of 2021. One tender frame and tank are now stored separately by Steamrail Victoria in West Block.

QW2 / VWBA2
The final well wagon entered service in 1960, classed QW2. Another unique design, this vehicle was explicitly designed for loads both overlarge and incredibly heavy. The wagon was rated at 150 tons capacity, and weighed 93 tons on its own.

Because of this incredible mass, well outside normal railway standards for the era, the well wagon unit was not fitted with its own bogies. Instead, it shared second-tier bogie units with QS2 / VFHA2; these were beams that were placed between the wagon frame and four- or six-wheel bogies, depending on the load to be transported. Either two- or three-axle locomotive tender bogies could be fitted, depending on the weight of the load to be transported. If the latter, they were borrowed from the abovementioned QH wagons.

The vehicle was initially used to transport equipment to Cudgewa for the Snowy Mountains scheme, from where the load was trans-shipped to road transport. After the project was completed the vehicle was generally stored at Newport Workshops, only being utilised occasionally.

In 1979 it was recoded VWBA2, and by 1988 it was in storage at Eaglehawk, near Bendigo. As of 17 February 2003 it was owned by VicTrack, allocated to the ARHS, and mounted on 4 sets of four-wheel, 50-ton capacity bogies.

QS 2 / VFHA/VFHF 2
QS2 was built in 1962 to support the Snowy Mountains scheme. It was designed as something of a combination of QS1 and QW2, featuring a longer frame and the ability to be mounted on four of either four- or six-axle bogies as required. The horizontal beams between the bolsters could be moved closer or further apart as required; in narrow format the wagon was 9'8.375" wide, while in wide form it was 11'10.5" wide., the latter number significantly wider than the normal railway loading gauge.

While fitted with the two-axle bogies it was capped at 120 tons load, but when the three-axle bogies were in use it could support 170 tons. Either way, when operating it had to run at a very low speed, often 10 mph on mainlines and 5 mph through stations. To accommodate this it was most often used on Sundays, when relatively few other trains were operating; and if running to Gippsland as in the 1970s, this was also the one day per week when the overhead power lines were switched off, removing a risk for tall loads.

When not in use it was stored at Newport Workshops.

In 1979 it was officially recoded as either VFHA or VFHF (sources differ), although it is not clear when the change was actually made or if it ever ran in service with that code. By 1990 it had been removed from bogies and placed on the grass in the Workshops compound. Like the other preserved vehicles in this category, it is owned by VicTrack; it is allocated to the ARHS Museum, and stored in the Newport West Block on four, four-wheel bogies fitted with plain bearings.

VQWW 1
In 1990, the articulated "three-pack" flat wagon VQAW 5 was constructed with two normal skeletal container flat sections, but the centre unit as a slightly longer well wagon in lieu of the normal design. It was recoded to VQWW within a few weeks. In 1994 it was recoded to RQVY for National Rail use. In 1998 it was stored at Alice Springs, still with V/Line logos, and by 2001 its components had been disassembled in situ.

The tare weight across all three units was 37 tonnes, and the capacity was 113 tonnes.

Less-than-Container-Load traffic (LCL)
For traffic that did not need the full capacity of a standard ISO 20 ft container, smaller units were constructed that were compatible with ISO brackets. These needed custom rolling stock, fitted with brackets at the correct intervals. A standard LCL unit was about 5 ft long, so a 15 ft underframe could be made to hold three containers.

Like later examples with ISO container frames, the mounting points of LCL containers were used with custom carrying designs for specific transport jobs.

One of the first dedicated LCL traffic runs in Victoria was for tallow (animal fats) which were transported from Wodonga to Melbourne in insulated, steam-heated drums, and other runs included bulk cement deliveries.

KC & KMC
To cater for this traffic, in 1954 twenty IY wagons had their sides and ends removed and new container locks welded into position. The new vehicles were classed K 87–106, quickly recoded to KC to avoid confusion. A further ten wagons were converted to KC 112–121 in 1955. In 1958-59 the position of the brackets was altered to match New South Wales' LCL containers, which were quickly becoming a standard.

Three KC wagons (88, 92 and 93) were recoded KMC 1–3 in 1963, and allocated specifically to traffic generated by the Mayne Nicklaus road transport company. When that traffic dried up the wagons were used interchangeably with KC's. The fleet had been withdrawn by the end of 1980.

43ft QC, QCF, QCX & QTF
In 1959 ten E open wagons had their sides removed and replaced with locks at suitable positions, permitting carrying of six LCL containers each. They were recoded QC1–10. In 1961 they had roller bearing bogies fitted and were recoded QCF, reflecting their higher maximum speed. In 1965 they were altered further, becoming gauge-exchangeable and recoded QCX. A further three were converted in 1970 and coded QTF, explicitly reserving them for tallow traffic from the pet food factory in Wodonga, and an abattoir in Wangaratta. The wagons were withdrawn by 1978 and converted to HR bogie transport vehicles.

Standardised Intermodal container (ISO) traffic
This section covers wagons designed with the standard 20 ft container in mind, being fitted with securing ports at distinct intervals. Many of these wagons could be used in other traffic if required, but such use was rare—particularly for the skeletal variants. Containers were most commonly 20 ft or 40 ft over ends, with occasional 10 ft, 30 ft or 48 ft versions. The 20 ft frame is also used to secure fuel tanks or as a cattle transport unit. Wagons that were designed for general traffic but provided with container ports are covered above.

Bogie stock

FQX, FQF, VQCX & VQCY (63ft deck)
1969 saw the Victorian Railways' first official foray into ISO traffic. A design was shared between the Victorian and South Australian Railways and coded FQX, with SAR wagons numbered below 500 and Victorian wagons 501 and above. Each wagon had a 63 ft flat and solid deck, designed for fork lifts of up to 6,000 lbs wheel loading. Holes were drilled for removable anchor plates for either three 20 ft containers, one 20 ft and one 40 ft container, or two 20 ft containers each fitted with clip-on refrigeration units. The wagons were also fitted with provision for baulks and stanchions, if required in general use. The loading diagram indicates that when used for loading mounted on baulks, weight permitted was 27.5 tons over each bogie, decreasing to 10 tons in the centre and less on the ends. Wagons weighed a little under 20 tons each, had a maximum capacity of 55 tons, and cost around $37,670 each to build.

By the end of March 1969 four wagons had entered service, with more than a few wagons entering service per month until FQX 625 in July 1970. Construction picked up again in July–August 1971 with a further 50 wagons and 150 more from the end of 1972 through October 1973, up to FQX825. Another 100 were delivered in the second half of 1975, and the final batch of FQX 926 to 935 were built at the end of 1977.

In the late 1970s about 100 FQX wagons were recoded to FQF, exclusively for use on the broad gauge system, to ensure that enough vehicles were available for intrastate traffic. Nominally, these were to be 501–600, but in practice some of that range stayed as FQX while others, such as 637, were converted instead. Aside from changing the code, many FQF wagons had full-length lashing rails added along the side frames, and the number was placed on a panel below the frame rather than painted directly onto it.

A further 75 wagons were constructed to the same design, but taking on the new code of VQCX, in early to mid 1980, giving the final class member as VQCX 1010. The FQF wagons were recoded VQCY, although many returned to VQCX around 1985.

In 1993 75 wagons were randomly selected and recoded to VQRF, numbers 1 through 75, specifying that they were to be used for rice container traffic from Echuca to ports in Melbourne and Geelong. They were most often loaded with one 20 ft container either end, and the centre portion of the wagon used for loading and unloading.

In late 1994 most of the freight fleet was transferred over to the National Rail Corporation, and the remaining VQCX wagons were relettered to RQCX. By 1996 they were being returned to V/Line and their previous designations, as NR introduced new build articulated container wagon sets in their place, although some had been painted grey.

SDS Models has produced ready-to-run versions of the series in HO scale, while Steam Era Models has kits available.

VQMX
In 1997 seventy wagons, randomly selected, had a different type of container lock fitted to speed up loading and unloading; these were recoded VQMX. In 1998, a further group were recoded to TQCY, being specifically allocated to Toll Group traffic. When Freight Victoria, later Freight Australia, acquired the V/Line Freight division, the remaining wagons were included in the sale. A few years later some were transferred to Pacific National, while others were sold to Queensland Rail. The latter recoded their new acquisitions QQGY, for use on the Melbourne to Brisbane services.

AQCX
The South Australian fleet were mostly identical, with only minor differences in brake equipment and storage of fittings. They totalled 122 units, and when overtaken by Australian National they were recoded from FQX/F to AQCX/Y. The whole fleet was sold to National Rail, who modified the wagons by removing portions of the deck, in order to reduce wagon weight. The newly "skeletised" wagons were coded RQTY.

FCF, FCW, VQDW & VQEW (81ft "Jumbo" flats)
From 1973, experiments were run with a new type of wagon designed to transport taller-than-normal containers. The larger containers were needed for a contract with TNT to move General Motors Holden car components between Acacia Ridge (QLD), Fishermans Bend, Geelong (VIC) and Elizabeth (SA), and were built at a cost of $76,540 each. The wagons initially ran in conjunction with South Australian FCW and New South Wales JCW, although in modern times they tend to be used in general traffic. They were fitted to carry two 40 ft containers or four 20 ft containers equally spaced, although a single 40 ft container could be mounted in the centre. Theoretically there would be nothing to prevent loading with one 40 ft and two 20 ft containers, though weight distribution may be a concern.

Known colloquially as the "Jumbo" container flats, the new design was achieved using bogies with smaller diameter wheels to give a lower deck, and counteracted with "gooseneck" couplers to restore the coupler centreline to the correct height. At 85 feet plus couplers, the wagons were the longest employed on the network, designed to carry two 40 ft containers or four 20 ft containers. Given this length, they were banned from being coupled to fixed-wheelbase vehicles. They had a strong centre sill with a skeletal framework around it, giving a tare weight of less than 24 tons, and a capacity of 53 tons. The excess length risked problems with overhang on tight curves in Melbourne Yard, so to help avoid this the wagons were coupled into sets of five each. The wagons were fitted with two brake pipes at each end, one either side of the coupler. The fleet was permitted to operate at 70 mph / 115 km/h, although when loaded to a gross weight between 76 and 80 tons the speed limit decreased to 50 mph / 80 km/h.

The new code was FCF, with vehicles 1 and 2 entering service in at the end of 1973, FCF 3 entering in early 1974, and FCF 4 through 25 in late 1975. Vincent notes that most of the fleet had actually been constructed earlier, but were kept in storage until mid-1976. Sixteen wagons were also constructed at the Islington Workshops for the South Australian Railways, entering service between 1973 and 1974. Contrary to policy in every other case where the VR and SAR shared a design, these wagons used the same number series 1–16 but the code SFCW.

In 1977 the Victorian code was changed to FCW, both to avoid confusion with the newly recoded FQF-ex-FQX wagons, and to indicate the custom bogies. The "W" suffix indicated that bogie exchange was possible, but only within the "W" group. In 1979 the code was changed again to VQDW, while the South Australian wagons became AQDW.

1983 to 1984 saw new VQDW wagons 26–52 and 61–75 constructed, followed by 53–60 in 1986. Such a split may indicate that the former group was intended for one traffic, and the latter for another until the gap was filled. There is also at least one reference to wagons VQDW 76–79, but no evidence to corroborate that.

Between 1986 and 1988, 12 unidentified wagons were leased from V/Line to  Australian National and were renumbered AQDW 17–28; within a year they had been modified by AN to feature fixed shunters steps in lieu of the retractable design that V/Line had been using. The wagons were restored to their VQDW code and number on return to V/Line.

From 1987 a further 30 wagons were hired to the NSW railways and recoded to NQMW, numbers between 60050 and 60079. The wagons had previously been VQDW 1, 3, 26, 30–36, 38, 40–41, 43–51, 57, 59–60, 64, 68–69 and 74–75 respectively.

In 1990, VQDW 66 was fitted with the "Roadmaster" bogies which had previously been placed under test wagon VQPW 1. It was reclassed to VQEW 66, and permitted to operate at 115 km/h. In 1994 it was leased to the National Rail Corporation and became RQDW 66.
As at 1997, VQDW 4 and 5 were permanently coupled with a drawbar.

When leased to the National Rail Corporation from 1994, Jumbo container wagons were leased or purchased from Victoria, New South Wales and South Australia and grouped together as the single RQDW class. The remaining Victorian wagons (including 66) stayed in the 1–75 and NSW in the 60050–60079 range, but this created conflicts between some ex-AQDW and ex-VQDW wagons. To resolve that, AQDW 2, 4, 6 and 9 became 102, 104, 106 and 109, although the other 12 AQDW wagons kept their original numbers.
Some vehicles have since been returned to their previous controllers and recoded to other purposes; 60079 was fitted with normal bogies and recoded NQEX, while a number (including 9, 19 and 54) were returned to V/Line and the VQDW code.

As at 1997, VQDW 4 and 5 were permanently coupled with a drawbar.

While under NR control, sixteen wagons were recoded RQDF and a further four as RQDY, likely indicating higher speed bogies. Ten were recoded to RQNW indicating mounting points for 48 ft containers along with higher maximum speeds, and the remaining twenty-one ex-NSW vehicles were recoded RQPW—although it is not clear (at time of writing) what distinguishing feature makes the new class necessary. It is unlikely that there is any relationship to the test wagon VQPW 1.
In 1998, VQDW 4, 5, 12 and 29 were recoded VEDW and had 415V head-end power cables and plugs fitted, permitting them to supply power to containers loaded with perishables

Pacific National now owns the remaining fleet, having acquired them through National Rail as well as Freight Victoria / Freight Australia.

SQEF/SQEY ("Jumbo" flats)
When QUBE Logistics won a number of freight contracts from Pacific National in 2013, they invested in a fleet of skeletal container wagons. The initial delivery was of 15 each SQEF broad gauge and SQEY standard gauge wagons numbered 00001 to 00050 and 00051 to 00090 respectively; the former restricted to 80 km/h while the latter are permitted to run at 115 km/h. The broad gauge wagons were allocated to the Maryvale paper train and the Deniliquin rice train, while the standard gauge wagons were used on the Harefield service.

The standard gauge wagons have a tare weight of 23 tonnes and a capacity of 77 tonnes, while the broad gauge wagons are slightly heavier with a commensurate reduction in capacity. Notably, the axles of these were designed to permit future conversion to standard gauge, although the bogie bolsters would still restrict the vehicles to the lower speed limit.

Delivery
The wagons were unloaded at Carrington wharf in pairs, with the broad gauge wagons placed on top of the standard gauge units and tied together for the run down to the QUBE depot in Somerton. On arrival they were unloaded by crane and gradually placed into service.

The first delivery run had 14 wagon pairs thus:

(Note absence of SQEF00009 and SQEY00054.)

By early 2014 the remaining broad gauge wagons had been cleared out of Somerton for introduction to the Deniliquin rice train.

QMX, VQFX/Y, RCFX/F/Y (63ft skeletal)
By 1978 it was becoming clear that ISO containers were the future of long-distance transport, so the railways had a reduced requirement for wagons that could be used with other goods. To cut down the weight and cost of construction, the FQX design was modified to a skeletal layout. In 1979/80, the cost per wagon was around $36,420 each; taking into account inflation, that made for a 15% saving on construction cost when compared to the earlier FQX design.

Forty wagons to the new design were initially constructed at Bendigo, followed by 20 at Newport. All had entered service by the middle of 1978. The code was unusual relative to previous VR practice because the 1979 recoding was just around the corner, and it would have been easy to recode from "QMX" to "VQMX". However, by the time the new codes were adopted the official code was "VQFX", requiring repainting of the code boards.

Like their predecessors, these wagons could take three 20 ft containers, or one 40 ft plus one 20 ft. Weight was reduced to just over 18 tons, and capacity increased to 57 tons. As with earlier classes, the fleet was permitted to be overloaded by up to four tons if the speed limit was reduced to 80 km/h.

A further 75 wagons were built in 1980 at Bendigo Workshops, entering service as VQFX. In the late 1980s these latter vehicles were provided with upgraded bogies, permitting higher speeds for the Melbourne to Adelaide Superfreighter services. They were reclassified VQFY to reflect the higher operating speed.

The remaining sixty vehicles were leased to the National Rail Corporation in 1994 and reclassed RQFX. Speculation at the time was that the fleet would be returned to Victoria, but a number were upgraded to 2CM bogies permitting a higher operating speed, and recoded to RQFY. Many are now operating with Pacific National, as RQFX.

SDS Models has produced ready-to-run models of the wagons.

VQGX
During 1980–1981, the remaining fourteen flexi-van bogie wagons, classed VQBX/VQBY, were converted to regular container wagons, and reclassed VQGX.

Wagons previously numbered 30, 29, 26, 32, 38, 27 and 31 had the turntable equipment removed and the drop-centres filled in, but retained the drooped ends, and taller-than-normal ISO container ports were installed at the outer corners to compensate for the difference in height. These became VQGX 1-3 and 13-16 respectively. The remaining flexivan wagons, 12, 14, 25, 13, 22, 11, 23 and 25, were recoded to VQGX 4-12 and essentially rebuilt to a normal container wagon profile, with a flat deck.

In 1994 the entire class of sixteen was leased to the National Rail Corporation and recoded RQZX., although when returned to Victoria in 1996 they were restored to their earlier codes. In 1997, VQGX 14 was reclassified as VZKF14.

VQKX
Between April and July 1990, eight VFKX flat wagons were converted to VQKX 1–8. A further seven were converted between July and September, numbered 100–106, although there is no apparent difference between the two series. The wagons had container ports spaced to permit loading of pairs of 30 ft ISO units, for CRT Group traffic between Bandiana and Melbourne.

In 1991 numbers 4 and 8 were converted to VKEX 213 and 214 respectively.

VQLX
Following on from other conversions of assorted general traffic flat wagons to container flat wagons, between 1987 and 1989, 115 ex-SFX and similar wagons were stripped down with ends, side stanchions and decks removed, and replaced with container anchor fittings, for three 20 ft containers. The new code was VQLX, and donor classes were VQEX/Y, VFLX/Y, VFMX, VFNX, VFPX and VFTX/F. Wagon numbers were not always retained, though generally speaking the VFLX wagons kept their numbers. The final number range was 1 to 145.

VQAW & VQWW (articulated)
In 1989 V/Line decided to experiment with a new articulated type of container wagon, using three skeletal decks each with a capacity of one 40 ft or two 20 ft containers, and suspended over four bogies. VQAW2 entered service in late 1989 as a trial, fitted with "Roadmaster" bogies. VQAW 3 and 4 entered service in March and May 1990 respectively, to the same design, but VQAW5 was built using a well wagon design for the centre unit instead of the flat design of the rest. Within a few weeks it had been recoded VQWW 1.

In November 1990, VQAW 1 finally entered service, this time fitted with experimental Gloucester bogies. A few weeks later, VQAW2 derailed near Homebush, New South Wales. Victorian and New South Wales authorities could not agree on the cause, so NSW banned the VQAW series from their network.

From 1992 a further 19 wagons of the class were built, including a replacement VQAW 5 and numbered to 23. In 1993 VQAW 3 was disassembled at South Dynon, and it was noted at Islington, South Australia, in June 1994. The remaining wagons, 1–2 and 4–23, were recoded RQUY for use by the National Rail Corporation. As of 2013, Victorian operations were authorised for the class VQAW by Pacific National at 110 km/h. BQEW 2401 and 2402 were listed as ex-VQAW and 115 km/h maximum speed, under a "to be advised" operator though the "B" prefix indicates Southern Shorthaul Railroad. They were authorised to operate at 115 km/h. Each trio of vehicles came to a cost of nearly $350,000.

VQSW
This was a short-lived experiment in 1992, to trial a shorter-framed, low-level skeletal container wagon with capacity for only one 40 ft, 45 ft or 48 ft, or two 20 ft containers. The project ran out of funds, so only VQSW 1 was built.

The wagon had a tare weight of about 15.5 tonnes, and a capacity of around sixty tonnes. It was provided with a "miner" type handbrake at one end.

VQOX
Between 1994 and 1995, "at least fifteen" VOFX bogie open wagons had their doors removed, and brackets installed in the deck for two 20 ft ISO containers. They were recoded VQOX, and later had the side panels between the former doors removed as well, when forklift operators found it difficult to load and unload containers efficiently.

As at 2006, known numbers were 11, 31, 58, 99, 101, 110, 133, 302, 355, 1036, 1091, 1092, 1121, 1157 and 1164. The wagons retained their numbers when recoded.

VQPW
In February 1987, VOBX 366 had everything above the frame removed, and container brackets fitted to carry two 20 ft ISO units. It was provided with new "roadmaster" bogies, as an experiment for a new type to be introduced under the forthcoming VQAW three-pack articulated vehicles. It was reclassified as VQPW 1. In 1992 the bogies were transplanted to VQEW 66, and it was scrapped in 1993.

VECX, VEDW & VEKX—Head end power
In 1990 and 1991, eighteen VKFX and two VQFX wagons were modified with container ports fitted, but also with 415vAC head-end power cables, sockets and isolation equipment. When coupled and connected to a head-end power supply, whether from a locomotive, power van or "power pack" container, the wagons could provide power to loaded containers that needed built-in refrigeration for perishable goods, primarily fruit traffic from the Sunraysia District.

They were originally numbered VEKX 200 to 219, and in 1996 they were joined by 220 to 229 converted from low-numbered VQFX wagons.

VEKX 228 was temporarily recoded VEKY circa 2001/2002.

The fleet was increased in 1998 by six wagons—VQCX 510, 511 and VQDW 4, 5, 12 and 29—respectively being recoded to VECX and VEDW, retaining their original numbers.  Notably, VEDW 4 and 5 are permanently coupled with a drawbar in lieu of couplers. Another five VQCX were converted to VECX in late 2000, becoming VECX 512–516.

Fixed-wheel stock
Due to limited funding, from the 1960s through the 1980s the railways were not able to construct or acquire enough bogie container wagons.

KQ
To overcome this, thirty outside-sill RY wagons were rebuilt at Bendigo Workshops in 1969 as KQ 1–30, followed by 31–60 converted at Ballarat North Workshops in 1972–73. The former open wagons had everything above the underframe removed, and replaced with four container locks and six hardwood floor bearers the length of the frame; the latter to keep containers slightly elevated in order to avoid water pooling under a loaded container.

The wagons were only able to carry a single 20 ft container, and many were semi-permanently fitted with MC cattle containers in lieu of constructing new cattle wagons. They could be coupled to KL type wagons, if a container was on a wagon and its contents needed to be accessed.

The fleet did not last long, with the majority scrapped between 1978 and 1981 as new bogie wagons entered service.

SDS Models has produced ready-to-run HO scale versions of KQ 1–30.

KMQ
Immediately following the cessation of the RY to KQ conversion program, the Victorian Railways switched to conversion of U, T, and KAB frames as a longer variant of the four-wheel container wagon concept. These classes had a 15'0" wheelbase and a 25'7" frame, instead of the RY style 11'6" wheelbase and 22'0.375" frame, making the wagons more stable. As previously, this was necessary because of a massive increase in traffic and no money available to construct new container wagons; in conjunction with much of the older four-wheel stock being withdrawn due to life expired bodies. Those bodies were removed (and often sold), and the frames fitted with container lugs and fitting a chequer-plate floor surface for traction. The frames were otherwise mostly unchanged, retaining the previous coupler and brake arrangements.

Early traffic was containerised rice from Deniliquin and canned fruit from Shepparton, both for export.

Number boards were installed at the left end of each side, but these projected above the frame and were often damaged during loading; eventually they were moved to the middle of the frame on each side.

Eventually, 314 KMQ wagons were created. Of those, fourteen used underframes dating back to 1908. The first eighty conversions took place in late 1974 through September 1975, followed by a second batch up to KMQ 132 at the end of 1976 and a few more through early 1977. From May 1977 construction accelerated, and by the end of October 1981, KMQ 280 had entered service. There is a gap in records after that point, but between 1981 and 1984 additional wagons up to KMQ 314 had been built.

Some were fitted with additional container mounting points; 77 through 80 were able to carry a pair of 10 ft non-ISO containers, while 133–135 could take three 8'2.5" containers for transport between Sale and Dandenong. A few wagons, including but not limited to 56, 67, 86, 90, 102, 127 and 136, were also painted bright orange and allocated to explosives traffic, typically in Melbourne's western suburbs and using NOB-style 20 ft containers. These containers were not to be lifted from the wagons without explicit authority from the manufacturing plant.

Scrappings began in the early 1980s, and the vast majority were withdrawn by 1990.

Auscision Models has produced ready-to-run HO scale versions of the KMQ fleet, while SDS models has produced the NOB containers for the explosives traffic. The two brands are mostly compatible, although some detail may need to be filed or sanded off the corners of the containers to allow them to fit into the KMQ clips. Model Etch previously released a brass and whitemetal HO Scale kit of the KMQ, intended as a learning tool allowing modellers to build up their skill set.

KL loading platforms
When a bogie container wagon was loaded with a pair of 20 ft container wagons, they were placed with doors facing inwards and the centre deck was left free to permit access to the containers for loading and unloading before departure. This wasn't practical with the shorter KQ and KMQ wagons, which had no free deck space when loaded with a single 20 ft container. To overcome this issue, twenty long-wheelbase open wagons were reduced to frames, with a new sheet-metal deck fitted to act as a loading platform in yard areas.

Access in this way was particularly important in the early period of containerisation, when most loading sites did not have the necessary cranes or forklifts to remove containers from the wagons. As that equipment propagated the KL wagons became less important, and the fleet was withdrawn between the late 1970s and early 1980s.

In service, to replicate the utility of a single 63 ft wagon loaded with two 20 ft containers facing inwards, sets of wagons were assembled as KQ-KL-KQ with doors facing inwards. There is no indication as to what sort of material might have been used to cover the gap between KL and adjacent KQ wagons during loading, so the most likely answer is whatever was nearby that could take weight and span the 4 ft gap.

Specialist traffic

Firebrick traffic—KB
In 1970, open wagon IA 12711 had its sides and floor cut out. The floor was replaced with a grid, and the sides with five doors each. The interior of the wagon was then divided in half lengthwise and five compartments either side for a total of ten distinct areas. Initially for briquette traffic, by 1972 the wagon was being used for palletised firebricks from Dandenong to Yallourn. It was recoded KB 1 and used in that form until  1979. The vehicle was stencilled on the side as "Palletised firebricks Dandenong to Yallourn and Morwell". It was scrapped in October 1979.

Cement traffic—KCC
When the Snowy Mountains hydro-electric project was under construction in the 1960s, cement was railed from Geelong to Cudgewa then shifted to road vehicles for final delivery.

To make this trans-shipment easier and faster, custom plywood containers were designed and a group of 170 randomly assorted open, flat and ten cattle wagons were modified between 1962 and 1965 to transport them. The open wagons had their doors removed and the cattle wagons had their entire bodies removed, then container securing plugs were fitted.

Each KCC wagon could carry two, seven-ton loaded cement containers.

The Cudgewa line was one of Victoria's steepest, and runaway vehicles were frequent leading to some of the KCC fleet being scrapped after only a year or two in service. One such train was recorded at twice the maximum permitted speed around a curve before derailing. Written-off KCC wagons were replaced with other conversions taking on the same number.

As the cement traffic reduced the KCC wagons were stored, then modified for other uses as required. Generally speaking they were converted to IC (coal tippler), IK (safety wagons) and IT (timber wagons) between 1966 and 1969. Only six remained by mid 1975, stored at Newport Workshops, and even these were scrapped by 1980.

Motor car bodies—KF
In 1959, a set of 124 I and IA wagons were converted with doors removed, for the transport of motor car bodies from North Geelong to the new Ford plant at North Campbellfield. The wagons were initially coded KF 1–124, but this changed to KW in 1961 when the "F" suffix was used to identify "fast" vehicles with upgraded bogies, allowing running at 50 mph. By this point only 58 of the fleet were still running.

Each wagon could hold two motor car bodies, one on the floor and another suspended on removable beams attached to stanchions where the doors had previously been attached to the wagon bodies. The wagons weighed 7.5 tons each.

In 1962 a further 100 wagons were added to the KW fleet, becoming KW125–224; these ex-open wagons only had their doors removed, so could only transport one car body each rather than two.

From 1962–1964 the fleet was either scrapped, restored to I/IA format, or converted to DW water, IT timber or KCC cement wagons.

Prestige Containers—KPC
In 1963 a pair of K flat wagons were fitted with custom container ports, for the loading of containers from the Ararat fabric mills to West Footscray yard for distribution. The two were classed KPC and numbered 501 and 502, with the "P" in the code indicating the "Prestige" factory. The containers were supplied and loaded by the company. In 1969 a further two, 503 and 504, were added to the fleet ex open wagons, and a fifth from an open tippler coal wagon in 1971. Notably, 503 and 504 were slightly longer than the other three. All five had been withdrawn from service by the mid-1980s.

Flexi-Van traffic
During early containerisation trials, the concept of the Flexi Van was introduced on Australian Railways. This involved semi-skeletal flat wagons with a turntable mounted in the middle, so that containers could be unloaded perpendicular to the train instead of requiring a crane. This method had been deployed successfully in America by the New York Central Railroad.

FV
To test the method, the South Australian Railways constructed four FV wagons; two for their system and two for the Victorian Railways.

In 1962 the VR's wagons were reclassified as FVF. They operated both on broad and standard gauge, although the latter was far more common. By 1979 they were both stored. It is not clear whether either wagon wore the code VQAY, and they certainly never operated as such. Instead, in 1982, they were converted to safety wagons (to separate dangerous loads from the rest of a consist), and recoded VDSY. Side sills were added to strengthen the underframes, and the central turntables were removed. By 1988 they had been recoded to VDSF.

TVF, TVX, VQBY, VQBX
The concept of the flexi van was deemed a success by both the New South Wales and Victorian Railways, and 25 TVF wagons were introduced for the Victorian Railways between 1962 and 1964 for the standard gauge service between Melbourne and Sydney. The wagons were 76'2.25" over coupling points, and featured two turntables inset into the frames at 37'6" centres. Capacity was two 35 ft containers, with 1'6" clear between them.

In 1965 they were reclassified TVX. A further ten vehicles were built in 1965, TVX 26–35. Four vehicles—27, 29, 31 and 32—were recoded to TVF in the early 1970s. The 1979 recode was VQBY/VQBX as appropriate, but only four—12, 14, 29 and 32—were relettered as the rest of the fleet was in storage; even the recoded vehicles likely never ran in service. They were never recoded to fix the Y/F mistake.

During 1980–1981, the remaining fleet of sixteen vehicles was converted to ISO-compatible container wagons, and reclassed VQGX. Seven retained the drop-ends with the central turntable well filled in, and the other nine had whole new decks fitted.

Pyneboard traffic
A small fleet of wagons were put aside for exclusive use by the Pyneboard factory, shipping sheets of compressed, pulped and rolled woodchips to Montague for distribution as an interior construction material. The factory was initially set up in Rosedale, before shifting to Mount Gambier just west of the Victorian and South Australian border in 1978.

QAB / VFCA
In 1963, Q flat wagon number 77 was rebuilt with a fixed bulkhead at one end and an adjustable bulkhead at the other. The latter unit could be shifted to give a loading space between 45'5" and 49'4", depending on the specific load. The adjustable bulkhead could also be decoupled from its mechanism and laid flat when not in use. The wagon was known as QAB 77 until 1964, when Q 106 and Q 87 were converted to the same configuration and all three recoded QAB 1–3. The fleet was intended to have been recoded VFCA in 1979, but they had all been scrapped by 1981.

SBX / VFJX
Traffic from the factory in Rosedale increased, and in response five new bogie wagons were constructed at Bendigo and classed SBX. The vehicles were initially priced at around $11,500 each and fitted with fixed bulkheads, but the non-handbrake end was modified to the adjustable type of the QAB wagons within a few years. They had a loading area range of 34'8" to 38'6". Another eight were built in late 1969 at Ballarat, numbered 6–13; these had slightly longer bodies but the same bogie centres. In 1979 they were recoded VFJX. The whole fleet was placed in storage during 1991–1992, and many had been scrapped by 1993.

KAB
In 1964/65 eleven U vans had their bodies removed at Bendigo Workshops. The newly cleared underframes were then fitted out in the same fashion as the QAB and SBX before them, this time with an adjustable loading area of between 20'11" and 24'10". The rebuilt wagons were classed KAB and numbered 1 to 11. A further 10 were added to the fleet in 1974, also built in Bendigo. The KABs were withdrawn during the early 1980s, and some converted to KMQ container wagons.

FPX / VFMX
In 1978, around the time the Pyneboard factory shifted to Mount Gambier, six randomly selected SFX flat wagons were recoded to FPX and renumbered 101 to 106. Bau notes that the major change was the fitting of a lashing bar, in addition to the lashing rings, along the wagon side frames, while Vincent writes that the lashing rail was only fitted on one side, and the other side had webbing winches fitted. The latter view is supported by McGrath's photo of VFMX 110 circa 1908. Vincent further mentions that the new origin required gauge-exchangeable bogies, but as the whole route was still broad gauge at the time it is not clear why. In the 1979 recoding the vehicles were recoded VFMX. A further seven were added to the fleet in 1980, converted from SFX/VFLX wagons and numbered 107 to 114. In 1987 VFMX 101 returned to VFLX 54 (recovering its original SFX number). The remainder were converted to VQLX container wagons around 1988, numbers 120 to 132.

Steel traffic
In 1967, a new steel rolling plant opened at Hastings, Victoria. Steel slabs were railed down to a branch line on the Stony Point Line, and rolled into thin sheetmetal primarily for the construction of cars in South Australia. Dedicated trains ran between the plant and Melbourne Yard; between there and South Australia the wagons were attached to regularly operating interstate trains.

SLX
As a stop-gap measure until proper vehicles could be organised, the traffic was handled with ten ELX wagons modified to handle the coils. ELX wagons 43, 2, 46, 9, 44, 40, 31, 3 and 45 were renumbered SLX 1–10 between late 1965 and early 1966. The wagons returned to their original ELX configuration and numbers about a year later, after a full train of CSX wagons had entered service.

CSX, VFSX, VCSX, RCSF
A batch of thirty CSX wagons 1 to 30 was constructed between 1966 and 1969 at Newport Workshops, using recycled tender frames from scrapped R Class steam locomotives and featuring ratchet handbrakes. CSX1 was designed with five cradles along the underframe, each capable of taking a steel coil between 2'6" and 4'6" diameter, and with equal-length platforms on either end of the cradles, for a total length over pulling lines of 35'8.75". The following nine wagons were built at four inches shorter, with a reduced platform depth at the non-handbrake end. Wagons 11 through 30 were all constructed with a 4'11" splice added between the bogies, and the first ten had this length added around the same time. With the exception of the classleader, which remained 4 inches longer, the fleet was then uniform at 40'3.75" over pulling lines. The extended underframe allowed the middle three cradles to take steel coils of up to 6'0" diameter.

A further sixty wagons CSX 31 to 90 were built at Ballarat North Workshops between 1972 and 1973, using wheel-type handbrakes. The new wagons were built with even shorter crew platforms at both ends, giving a design over pulling lines of 39'6.75", nine inches shorter than the extended CSX2–30 type. They entered service with tarpaulin hoops and end-bulkheads in place in order to shelter the steel from weather effects during transit and cut down on rust; these were later retrofitted to the first thirty vehicles.

Bray and Vincent note the wagon price of around $15,570 each, but it isn't clear whether that applies to the earlier or later batch.

The steel coils were very heavy, so like iron ore wagons the vehicles were relatively short. This gave more axles per train, spreading the total weight. Small coils were rated at ten tons, and large coils at sixteen, though it is not clear whether these numbers correspond to 2'6", 4'6" or 6'0".

In the 1979 recoding the wagons became VFSX. In the late 1980s a modification of the standard codes freed the second letter "C" to distinguish "coil steel" traffic from other flat wagons, and the code became VCSX. All wagons were recoded thus except 81 and 86, which had been damaged in 1982 and written off. The majority of the wagons were transferred from V/Line to the National Rail Cooperation in 1994, and recoded RCSX shortly after. With the standard gauge between Melbourne and Adelaide opening in 1995 the wagons were upgraded from 50 ton capacity to 70 ton capacity bogies, and the tarpaulin hoops and bulkheads were removed; tarps were simply pulled over the load and tied down instead. The change was workable because track quality had increased over time, permitting heavier axle loads. With these changes the code was altered to RCSF and the fleet was redeployed to Port Kembla in New South Wales. Not all wagons were repainted.

By 2003 the smaller coils were being placed in 20 ft containers for better protection, but these were incompatible with the RCSF fleet. As a result, flat wagons were converted to RCAF to take the containers, and some of the RCSF fleet were modified to only take "jumbo" coils.

Auscision Models has produced HO scale four-packs of the second generation of CSX wagons in various liveries and forms, along with tarps and steel coil loads available for purchase separately.

VKKX
Around 1990, eleven VFKX 75 ft flat wagons were fitted with baulks and reallocated to slab steel traffic. VKKX 4, 10, 16, 27, 36, 40, 42, 62, 66, 69 and 72 were renumbered VKKX 1 through 11. The wagons retained their numbers.

Other classes
From 1964 a small group of 26 wagons were constructed to the same general principles as the ELX type open wagons, which themselves were extended variants of the E-series open wagons that shared components with the S type flat wagons outlined above. The new batch of wagons were constructed with reinforced ends, but stanchions in lieu of doorways and sides, and they were fitted with timber planks across the base. They were intended to be used in steel traffic, hence the code ESX, but that never happened. Instead, the wagons were reallocated for pipe traffic as sewage, gas and water supply systems were extended around the state. In 1971 the class was fitted with longer couplers. Wagons had a tare weight of just over 21 tons, and a load capacity of 50 tons.

In 1976, ESX15 had taller stanchions fitted to cater for particularly large pipes.

In the late 1970s the NSW and Victorian Railways finally organised a contract for the transport of slab steel from Port Kembla, south of Sydney, to Hastings, south of Melbourne, replacing vessels running around the coastline. The ESX wagons were used for the broad gauge portion of this journey from Albury to Hastings, although it is not clear why the loads were trans-shipped instead of being bogie-exchanged either at Albury or Melbourne.

The class was recoded as VODX from 1979, and again to VOEX in 1984–85. This latter change was made to match other VOEX 1–12 wagons, which had been converted from ELX wagons. VODX units 13–26 retained their numbers, while 1–12 were renumbered to become 27–38. In 1986 a further 12 ex-ELX wagons were converted, and in 1987 the whole fleet was reclassed again to VKEX. When they came under the control of the National Rail Corporation in 1994, the code changed to RKEX.

Other open wagons of the ELX type were also rebuilt for the transport of steel coils, either in cradles (VOSX/VCCX), or vertically (VOVX/VCVX).

Timber traffic

Fixed wheel
Timber was usually transported using generic flat or open wagons. However, from the late 1950s more specialised vehicles were introduced, keyed to the requirements of individual traffic sets.

KT, KS, IS & IT
Between 1956 and 1957 timber traffic in the East Gippsland region increased, and pine tree billets needed to be railed from Bairnsdale and Heyfield to the paper manufacturing plant in Maryvale. To cater for this, 45 IY wagons had their ends extended, while the sides were removed and replaced with stanchions and internal dividers which split the wagon into three bays of roughly 7 ft each. The ends and internal dividers were braced. The wagons were numbered KT 320 to 634, slotting between the K flat and KR rail transport wagons. The taller sides, at nearly 10'5", permitted loading of 22 tons of timber, more than double the 9.85 ton tare weight.

KT 324 used a slightly different design to the rest of the class; instead of diagonal angle iron bracing, vertical plates with sections cut out were used.

As traffic grew even further through the early 1960s, about 270 I and IA 15 ft-wheelbase wagons were randomly selected for conversion to scantling timber transport. Because of the way the sawmills organised timber shipments, the wagons had to be designed with specific features, including a bulkhead at only one end for the longer timber lengths, and the axle at the other end being replaced for one with wheels that were 2" larger in diameter to counteract the concentrated mass. Pockets were cut into the floor of the wagons to store chains for securing the loads.

Open wagon I 11835 had been officially scrapped in 1957, but at the end of 1962 it was recovered and converted to IT 1. After a few months of trials conversions began in earnest, and by March 1973 a total of 273 wagons had been converted. There were some variances; IT 2 through 7 had the handbrake installed at the bulkhead end, and IT 252 was an experimental conversion from KT 320 as noted above; it only lasted a short while before being altered again to KS 7.

The timber loading siding at Bairnsdale station was usually occupied with between 10 and 15 KT wagons, being loaded by a travelling overhead gantry crane.

The first KS, 320, only lasted in service for about a year before being converted to KS 1, with its ends cut down to normal size and central bulkheads removed for generic sawn timber sheet transport. A further five unknown vehicles were converted to KS 2–5 of the same design and KS 6 with extended sides. 4, 5 and 7 were scrapped following a derailment in 1977.

The KT wagons ran in service until 1972, when the Maryvale paper mill switched to full-length pine logs delivered by road. In that year, KT 357 had its frame cut in the centre and extended by four feet, being reclassified IT 252. After that test proved successful, a further 21 of the fleet were converted to IS trucks 2–22 for scantling timber, in lengths up to 25 feet long. They joined a previous conversion, IA 11869 to IS 1 in 1971, although that wagon was normal height and retained its sides and doors. IT 252 was reclassified as KS 7 in 1973. After that, the remaining KT wagons had their internal dividers removed and they were reallocated to sawn timber traffic, mixing with IT wagons. They were gradually withdrawn from 1974, the last exiting service in 1981.

KM, KPW and KW
Three other experimental four-wheel wagons were constructed for timber-related traffic.

KM 1, the masonite wagon, was converted from open wagon I 15125 in 1958. The sides were mostly removed and replaced with a new panel in the centre, and strengthening ribs were fitted inside the ends to compensate for the lost strength. There is no available information regarding the specific traffic. It was stored around 1960, and in 1965 it was modified to cement wagon KCC 170.

KPW 1, the pulpwood wagon, was converted from open wagon IA 11350 in 1967. It had tall ends but no sides, instead having three removable fence panels each side. It is thought that the primary traffic was from Colac. The wagon was stored at Newport Workshops from 1974, and scrapped in 1977.

KW 1, the woodchip wagon, was converted from open wagon IA 10632 in 1967. It had tall ends, but the sides were replaced with a braced framework supporting four outward-swinging mesh sheet doors each. Primary traffic was supposed to have been from Colac with a log chipper and storage hopper erected in the station yard, but "something went wrong" and instead the logs were chipped at the sawmill then trucked direct to Melbourne. The wagon was unused for a full decade, until in 1977 when the sides and ends were removed and it was converted to standard gauge, painted yellow and used for transporting parts around the South Dynon Locomotive Depot.

Bogie stock
In 1979, the Victorian Railways decided to construct a small fleet of bogie wagons for timber transport.

VFTY/F/X
These became the first class to enter service with a four-letter code, VFTY, numbers 001 to 030. The zero prefix was in anticipation of a future computerised rolling stock management system. They were built at Ballarat Workshops at the same time as the VFNX flat wagons, and shared much of the design with that fleet.

The design was a flat wagon about 20 metres long, with fixed bulkheads at either end to a height of 3,167mm. Between the bulkheads were ten pairs of stanchions, the middle four on each side removable. One end, labelled "A", featured the miner-type handbrake wheel, while the other end was labelled "B", and the centre section with the removable stanchions was labelled "C". Each vehicle was priced at around $50,820 to construct.

Primary traffic was the Orbost line, replacing the IT wagons, but due to reduced maintenance the wooden bridges were unable to support the weight of two fully loaded VTFY wagons adjacent. To resolve this, random four-wheel wagons were required to be coupled between pairs, but this limited the train's maximum speed.

By the late 1980s most had been recoded to VFTF, fixing the original incorrect code. As timber traffic reduced some were recoded VTFX and placed on standard gauge for pipe traffic. But between 1987 and 1991 the majority of the fleet were converted to container wagons. They were grouped with the ex-VFLX series as VQLX, despite being over a metre longer at 20716mm against 19,488mm.

VFHX
In late 1995 log traffic increased again, so four VFNX wagons—4, 18, 122 and 144—were rebuilt with the retractable tarp mechanisms removed, and six sets of floor bolsters and stanchions fitted. The vehicles were recoded VFHX as the next available code in the sequence but retained their numbers, and they operated between the loading point at Warragul and the export point at Geelong. VFHX122 lost the curved top on one of its bulkheads fairly early on, and the handbrake end was squared off about a year later.

VFTX
As containerisation came to represent the majority of general freight on the railways, most of the VLEX louvre vans had been placed into storage. By the late 1990s Freight Victoria led a strong marketing campaign to acquire sawn log traffic from the Gippsland region to North Geelong, and to accommodate this 44 VLEX vans had their sides and roofs removed and replaced with stanchions and winches for the traffic. They were then recoded VFTX and numbered 1 to 44. By this point all the original VFTX wagons had been withdrawn or converted to other types, avoiding a conflict.

Carriage transport
The G and GH trucks were primarily used for the transport of horse-drawn carriages, but may also have been available for farming machinery and other vehicles. They were a flat wagon on a fixed wheelbase of either two or three axles, with very short side fences acting largely as guides for loading and removable bars at the ends of the vehicles.

A four-wheel wagon was rated at 10 Tons capacity, and three axles at 15 Tons.

Peter Vincent has hypothesised that this traffic would have operated in conjunction with horse box vehicles, requiring coordination in advance because the latter would often be used individually for race traffic. Photographs indicate that the trucks were stabled at major stations for quick deployment.

59 units were initially constructed between 1858 and 1890 with four wheels. The first two were constructed by Brown and Marshall in 1858, along with G3 through G6 by Wright & Sons (England) arriving 1858–1859. 1862 saw G7 constructed by the Railways' own Williamstown Workshops, along with G8 and G24 from Bray & Waddington (Leeds), and G9 through G23 from Miller & McQuiston. G25 through G39 were built by Scott & Young (Melbourne) in 1879, G40 through G49 in 1884 by Harkness & Co. (Sandhurst), and G50–59 in 1890 by Newport Workshops.

In 1888, G18 was scrapped and rebuilt, likely to the same dimensions. G3, 4, 5, 10 and 38 were scrapped and rebuilt in 1899 with 18-foot underframes, though it is not recorded whether these were fitted with four or six wheels; and in 1900, a replacement G1 entered service at Newport Workshops, again with no information available as to its configuration. The vehicles all had Westinghouse brake pipes fitted around 1889, though some had been involved in experiments with other braking systems previously.

Five units were scrapped in 1891 (including G1 and G2), followed by ten in 1892. 1893 saw G24 converted to corpse wagon C3. A further two each were scrapped in 1986-1897, nine in 1898 and two in 1902. In 1903 three were scrapped plus C3, followed by a final batch of nine in 1907.

Two replacement six-wheel units, G60 and 61, were built in 1915.

Between 1923 and 1925, the remaining 20 original units (excluding 60 and 61, but including the second G1) were converted to general purpose K flat wagons in the range 413–429, formerly G1, 3–5, 10, 37–38 and 50–59. It seems likely that G1 and G37, at least, had extended underframes constructed at some point so that K413–K419 consecutive would have been a long-underframe group, although there is no evidence to sustain this.

In 1937 the letter "G" was reallocated to grain wagons, so G60 and G61 were recoded GH.

K415–417 were scrapped between 1924 and 1933; followed by K414, 419, 420 and 424 in the 1940s, and the remaining nine in the 1950s. GH60 was scrapped in 1953, and GH61 in 1963.

Departmental Use
A range of flat wagons were used in and around workshops, as well as on ballast, rail and sleeper trains. Those are covered on the Departmental Wagons page.

Narrow-gauge Wagons

Just like the broad-gauge railways, the  narrow-gauge lines required open and flat wagons for general goods. Over two hundred NQR wagons were constructed between 1898 and 1914, and these were designed as open wagons with sides and ends removable for use as flat wagons if required. Notably, on the Colac to Crowes line in the 1920s, sets of three NQR wagons would be coupled to transport cut timber pilings of lengths between 75–78 feet.

Liveries
In general, flat wagons have been painted in Victorian Railways Wagon Red livery, equivalent to British Standard BS381C 445 Venetian Red.

References

flat wagons